is a Japanese actor, best known for his role as Daichi Ozora, the main character of the 2015 Ultra Series Ultraman X.

Filmography

TV series

Films

References

External links
  

1994 births
Living people
21st-century Japanese male actors
People from Tokyo